The Men's Junior European Volleyball Championship is a volleyball competition for men's national teams with players under the age of 20 years, currently held biannually and organized by the European Volleyball Confederation, the confederation for Europe.

Results summary

Medal summary

References

External links
Home page
CEV Men's Junior Volleyball European Championship – Competition History

 
Men's U21
Volleyball
European volleyball records and statistics
1966 establishments in Europe